Ayatollah Hashem Hashemzadeh Herisi (was born 1938 in Heris, East Azerbaijan) is an Iranian Shiite cleric and politician. He is a member of the 3rd and 4th and 5th Assembly of Experts from the East Azerbaijan electorate, since the midterm election in 2008. Also he was MP from electoral district Tabriz, Osku and Azarshahr for 3rd and 5th terms.

References

People from East Azerbaijan Province
Members of the Assembly of Experts
Living people
1939 births
Iranian ayatollahs
Deputies of Tabriz, Osku and Azarshahr
Members of the 3rd Islamic Consultative Assembly
Members of the 5th Islamic Consultative Assembly
Association of Combatant Clerics politicians